Clinical Interventions in Aging is a peer-reviewed open access medical journal covering research in gerontology. The journal was established in 2006 and is published by Dove Medical Press. The editor-in-chief is Nandu Goswami of the University of Graz.

Abstracting and indexing 
The journal is abstracted and indexed in:

According to the Journal Citation Reports, the journal has a 2012 impact factor of 2.651.

References

External links 
 

English-language journals
Open access journals
Dove Medical Press academic journals
Publications established in 2006
Gerontology journals